"Otan Aggeli Klene", an up-tempo ballad, is a Greek song by Helena Paparizou. It was exclusively impacted on some Greek radios on February 16 and officially released on February 23 as a digital single. The song was written by Amir Aly, Henrik Wikström, Bobby Ljunggren, Sharon Vaughn and the Greek lyrics are written by Yiannis Doxas, giving a special message about solidarity. This song serves as the lead single from her sixth Greek studio album "Ouranio Toxo" which was released on December 15, 2017.

The song features 10 titles of Paparizou's previous hit singles in Greece: I Kardia Sou Petra, Anapandites Klisis, Pirotehnimata, To Fos Sti Psyhi, Girna Me Sto Htes, To Fili Tis Zois, Iparhi Logos, Mazi Sou, Antithesis and Pou Pige Tosi Agapi

The English version "Angel" released in Sweden on April 24 by Capitol Music Group.

Music video
The music video premiered on VEVO on March 3. The video was shot on February 24, 2015, in Athens and was directed by Sherif Francis.

Track listing

01.Otan Aggeli Klene (Angel) – 03:05

02.Otan Aggeli Klene (Angel) (Singback Version) – 03:05

Charts

Release history

References 

2015 singles
Helena Paparizou songs
Pop ballads
Songs written by Henrik Wikström
English-language Greek songs
2015 songs
Songs written by Bobby Ljunggren
Songs written by Sharon Vaughn
EMI Records singles
Songs written by Amir Aly